Knox is a primarily masculine given name, a transferred use of a Scottish surname and place name from the Scots Gaelic "cnoc" or Old English cnocc, referring to a small hill with a round top.

Usage
The name increased in usage after Brad Pitt and Angelina Jolie used it for their son in 2008. The name has been among the one thousand most popular names for boys in the United States since 2009 and among the top 250 names for American boys since 2015. It has also been in occasional use for girls in that country. According to United States Social Security Administration statistics, 23 newborn American girls and 1,718 newborn American boys were named Knox in 2021. Variants of the name that add the modern suffix ley such as Knoxley are also in use for both boys and girls in the United States. Knoxlee and Knoxleigh, also adding the fashionable modern American  lee or leigh suffix and sound pattern, are also in use in the United States for girls. Variant spellings, adding a fashionable extra x, such as Knoxx are in use.  Also in use for American boys are elaborations such as Knoxson and Knoxton and Knoxtyn. It also has associations in the United States with Fort Knox.

Notable people
Knox (musician), stage name of Ian Milroy Carnochan, born 1945, British musician and founding member of the seminal punk band the Vibrators.
Knox Chandler, American session guitarist and cellist.
Knox Martin (1923-2022), American painter, sculptor, and muralist.

See also
Knox (surname)

Notes